The Nick Cannon Show is an American comedy television series and a spin-off of All That. It aired on Nickelodeon's SNICK block from January 12, 2002, to February 22, 2003, along with All That, The Amanda Show and Taina. The premise of the semi-scripted show was that its star, Nick Cannon, a former cast member on All That, would come across a situation he thought needed changing and then "take over" to make things better, or at least funnier. At the end of each episode, Cannon would write "Nick Cannon Was Here" on something related to the day's episode just so he could leave his mark. It was a constant running gag. The show has yet to air on Nickelodeon or its sister networks ever again.

After production and crew changes occurred in the second season, the program suffered from low ratings and was canceled in February 2003. On November 11, 2013, iTunes released volumes 1 and 2 of The Nick Cannon Show with a total of 19 episodes.

Guest stars on the show included Usher, Mary J. Blige, Britney Spears, Eddie Murphy, Will Smith, Willy Santos, Lil' Romeo, Kenan Thompson, Kel Mitchell and girl group 3LW.

Although a spin-off of All That, frequent collaborator Dan Schneider was not involved with The Nick Cannon Show.

Episode list
All episode titles begin with "Nick Takes Over" except for the last episode.

Season 1
 January 12, 2002	Nick Takes Over Your Family
 January 19, 2002	Nick Takes Over Your School
 January 26, 2002	Nick Takes Over A Wedding
 February 2, 2002	Nick Takes Over the Rodeo
 February 9, 2002	Nick Takes Over Hollywood
 February 16, 2002	Nick Takes Over Music
 February 23, 2002	Nick Takes Over The Beach
 March 2, 2002	Nick Takes Over London
 March 9, 2002	Nick Takes Over Style
 March 16, 2002	Nick Takes Over The Military
 March 23, 2002	Nick Takes Over Food
 April 6, 2002	Nick Takes Over Baseball
 April 13, 2002	Nick Takes Over  Nickelodeon
 April 20, 2002	Nick Takes Over Fitness

Season 2

15.	Sept 21, 2002	Nick Takes Over The Circus @ Circus Vargas
16.	Oct 5, 2002	Nick Takes Over A Zoo
17.	Oct 12, 2002	Nick Takes Over The Mall
18.	Nov 2, 2002	Nick Takes Over A Hospital
19.	Nov 9, 2002	Nick Takes Over The Law
20.	Nov 16, 2002	Nick Takes Over Space
21.	Nov 23, 2002	Nick Takes Over Holidays
22.	Jan 18, 2003	Nick Takes Over Transportation
23.	Jan 25, 2003	Nick Takes Over A Town
24.	Feb 1, 2003	Nick Takes Over Recreation
25.	Feb 1, 2003	Nick Takes Over Latanya's Life
26.	Feb 15, 2003	Nick Takes Over Hawaii
27.	Feb 22, 2003	The Best of Nick Cannon

References

External links
 

2000s American black television series
2000s American sketch comedy television series
2002 American television series debuts
2003 American television series endings
2000s Nickelodeon original programming
All That
American television spin-offs
Children's sketch comedy
English-language television shows
Television series by Tollin/Robbins Productions